Cronobacter malonaticus, formerly considered a subspecies of Cronobacter sakazakii, is a bacterium. Its type strain is CDC 1058-77T (=LMG 23826T =DSM 18702T).

References

Further reading

External links 
LPSN

Type strain of Cronobacter malonaticus at BacDive -  the Bacterial Diversity Metadatabase

Enterobacteriaceae
Bacteria described in 2008